Ogün Temizkanoğlu (born 6 October 1969) is a Turkish former international footballer. He played mostly for Trabzonspor and Fenerbahçe as a central defender. He also played for Konyaspor and Akçaabat Sebatspor. He retired after terminating his contract with Akçaabat Sebatspor on 12 August 2005.

He played for Turkey national football team and was a participant at the 1996 and 2000 UEFA European Championship.

See also
Ogün Temizkanoğlu: "Harika bir jenerasyon geliyor" – an extensive interview with Temizkanoğlu

Honours

Club
Trabzonspor
Turkish Cup: 1991–92, 1994–95
Turkish Super Cup: 1995

References

External links
 
 Ogün Temizkanoğlu at TFF

1969 births
Living people
Sportspeople from Hamm
Turkish footballers
Turkey international footballers
German footballers
German people of Turkish descent
UEFA Euro 1996 players
UEFA Euro 2000 players
Süper Lig players
Trabzonspor footballers
Fenerbahçe S.K. footballers
Konyaspor footballers
Akçaabat Sebatspor footballers
Turkey women's national football team managers
Association football defenders
Footballers from North Rhine-Westphalia
Mediterranean Games silver medalists for Turkey
Mediterranean Games medalists in football
Competitors at the 1991 Mediterranean Games
German football managers